

Buildings and structures

Buildings
 c. 1150
 Roof lantern of Florence Baptistery constructed.
 Romanesque church of Saint-Nectaire, Puy-de-Dôme, France built.
 Fantoft Stave Church built at Fortun in Norway.
 St Mary's parish church, Cholsey, England, substantially constructed.
 c. 1150–1160
 Church of St. Stephen at Marmoutier Abbey, Alsace, constructed.
 Bisaldeo temple in Vigrahapura, Sapadalaksha, constructed.
 1151
 Anping Bridge in China completed.
 Restoration of St. George's Basilica, Prague, with twin towers, completed following siege damage in 1142.
 Zamora Cathedral in Spain begun.
 1152 – Great St. Martin Church, Cologne begun.
 1153 – Pisa Baptistry in Italy begun by Diotisalvi.
 1155 – Basilica of San Michele Maggiore, Pavia, Italy completed. It is one of the best surviving examples of Lombard Romanesque architecture.
 1156 – In France:
 Senlis Cathedral begun.
 Reconstruction of Château de Chinon begun.

Births

Deaths
 January 13, 1151 – Abbot Suger (b. c.1081), French abbot-statesmen and patron of Gothic architecture.

References

12th-century architecture
1150s works